Fatma Ulviye Sultan ("one who abstain" and "exalted, lofty"; 11 September 1892 – 25 January 1967) was an Ottoman princess, the daughter of Sultan Mehmed VI and Nazikeda Kadın.

Early life
Fatma Ulviye Sultan was born on 11 September 1892 in her father's palace in Ortaköy. Her father was Sultan Mehmed VI, son of Sultan Abdulmejid I and Gülistu Kadın. Her mother was Nazikeda Kadın, daughter of Hasan Marshan and Fatma Horecan Aredba. She was the second daughter born to her father and mother. She had two sisters, Münire Fenire Sultan, four years elder than her and died as newborn, and Rukiye Sabiha Sultan, two year younger than her. She had a younger half-brother, Şehzade Mehmed Ertuğrul, son of Müveddet Kadın.

Refik Bey, the son of Mihrifelek Hanım, the second kalfa of Sultan Abdulmejid I was appointed teacher to Ulviye, and her younger sister Sabiha Sultan. The two had learned to play piano from Mlle Voçino.

First marriage
In February 1916, after the death of the heir to the throne Şehzade Yusuf Izzeddin, her father was given the title of the crown prince. By now Ulviye had grown and reached the age of maturity. Ulviye married Ismail Hakki Pasha, son of the last grand vizier of the Ottoman Empire, Ahmed Tevfik Pasha and his wife Elisabeth Tschumi's on 10 August 1916, in a yalı in Kuruçeşme. The marriage was performed by Şeyhülislam Hayri Efendi. Her dowry was fixed to 1000 gold coins.

The couple settled in the yalı in Kuruçeşme. The two together had a daughter, Suade Hümeyra Hanımsultan born on 4 June 1917. In October 1920, her father bought two houses for his daughters in Nişantaşı. The mansions were known as the Twin Palaces. He gave one house to Ulviye Sultan, and the other to Sabiha. Ulviye divorced her husband on 21 June 1922.

Second marriage
After her divorce, Ulviye married Ali Haydar Bey Germiyanoğlu, son of Zülüflü Ismail Pasha on 1 November 1923 in the Nişantaşi Palace. No issue came of this marriage.

At the exile of the imperial family in March 1924, Ulviye, her husband and her daughter settled in San Remo. After her father's death in 1926, she moved to Monte Carlo, and in 1929, she relocated to Alexandria.

In 1952, Ulviye Sultan and her family returned to Istanbul after the revocation of the law of exile for princesses. Here she settled in İzmir with her daughter.

Death
Ulviye Sultan died on 25 January 1967 at the age of seventy-four, and was buried in Aşiyan Cemetery, Istanbul. Her husband outlived her by three years and died in 1970.

Honours
 Order of the House of Osman
 Order of the Medjidie, Jeweled
 Order of Charity, 1st Class

Issue

Ancestry

References

Sources

 

1892 births
1967 deaths
Royalty from Istanbul
19th-century Ottoman princesses
20th-century Ottoman princesses